Jilin City No.1 High School (Pinyin: jí lín shì dì yī Zhōng xué), commonly abbreviated as Jilin Yizhong, is a public key high school in Jilin City, Jilin, China.

History
Jilin City No.1 High School was founded in 1907, in the 33rd year of the reign of the Guangxu Emperor. In 1905 the Qing dynasty abolished the traditional imperial examinations, and decided to reform China's education system based a Western model. In 1907 it increased its support for educational reform.

In 1907 several Chinese scholars who had studied overseas, including Sun Shutang, Zhao Mingxin, Nie Shuqing, Ba Yang'a and Wu Yusen, returned to China and wrote a joint letter to the government, proposing the establishment of a modern high school. On March 29, 1907, the Jilin Academy was established, the first government-run general high school in China. In 1912, shortly following the end of the Qing dynasty and the establishment of the Republic of China (1912–49), the school was renamed "Jilin High School", and was expanded to offer four years of schooling.

In 1931, after Japan occupied Manchuria, Chinese Communist Party agents secretly developed a cell on campus, a student-led patriotic group named the "Society for Mutual Aid". While Northeast China was administered by the Japanese puppet-state of Manchukuo (1931-1945), students from Jilin No. 1 High School repeatedly scored among the top students in Manchukuo.

In 1959, a decade after the founding of the People's Republic of China, the school was renamed "Jilin City No.1 High School". After the Cultural Revolution occurred in 1966, the school was shut down by Red Guards. It remained closed until 1973, when it was allowed to reopen, with a limited curriculum and attendance, due to the presence and influence of some staff on a local revolutionary committee. In 1976, following the death of Mao Zedong, the school campus was expanded to 10,000 square meters. In 1978, following the educational and economic reforms of Deng Xiaoping, the school was identified as a model for reforming the education system in Jilin province, and was allowed to resume the educational mandate that it had exercised before the Cultural Revolution. In 2003 the Jilin provincial government recognized Jilin City No.1 High School as a "key school", giving it special funding and developing it as a prestigious school within the province of Jilin.

Campus
Over its history, the school has moved to different campuses six times. Its current campus covers 285,000 square meters, of which 136,000 square meters has been developed. It has 4,557 students in 90 classes—from grade 10 to grade 12—and 417 staff members.

See also

 History of education in China#Republican era
 High School Attached to Northeast Normal University
 Jilin Yuwen High School

References

External links
 

High schools in Jilin
Educational institutions established in 1907
1907 establishments in China